Yellow dwarf or Yellow Dwarf may refer to:

 Yellow dwarf star, more accurately called a G-type main-sequence star
 Yellow dwarf cichlid, a species of fish
 Yellow Dwarf (card game), the French card game of Nain Jaune
 Yellow Dwarf (film), a 2001 Russian comedy film
 The Yellow Dwarf, a French literary fairy tale by Madame Marie-Catherine d'Aulnoy published in 1698
 The Yellow Dwarf (journal), a satirical French political journal of the 19th century
 The Yellow Dwarf, nickname of French statesman, Jean Jardin
 The Yellow Dwarf (novel), a novel by Pascal Jardin published in 1978

See also
 Barley yellow dwarf (BYD), a plant disease affecting cereals caused by the barley yellow dwarf virus (BYDV)
 Onion yellow dwarf virus (OYDV), a plant virus mainly infecting species of Allium